Giacobbo is a surname of Jewish origin. Notable with this surname include: 

 Massimiliano Giacobbo (born 1974), retired Italian professional football midfielder
 Roberto Giacobbo (born 1961),  Italian journalist, author, television presenter and television writer
 Viktor Giacobbo (born 1952), Swiss writer, comedian and actor

See also 
 Giacobbe